The Lebanese National Rugby Union team have yet to make their debut at the Rugby World Cup. Lebanon played their first test match against  on 14 May 2010 in Dubai The Phoenix currently competes in the Asian Rugby Football Union's, Asian Rugby Championship in Division Three West. In November 2018 Lebanon Rugby attained World Rugby Associate Membership.

On 19 June 2014 the Phoenix defeated Pakistan in the semifinal of the Asian Rugby Football Union's, Asian Five Nation Division 3 West tournament in Lahore, Pakistan, 17 – 3 to book a place in the final on 22 June 2014 against Uzbekistan in Lahore. Lebanon defeated Uzbekistan 20 – 19 to win the tournament.

On 14 April 2015 Lebanon hosted the 2015 Asian Rugby Championship division 3 West tournament in Jounieh, Lebanon. They defeated Jordan in the first round 71 – 3 and won against Iran 27 – 8 to secure their third consecutive Asian title.

In April 2016 Lebanon took part in the Asian Rugby Championship division 3 West tournament held in Doha, Qatar. On 19 April 2016, Lebanon beat Iran 34-12 and went on to face Qatar in the final. Although they led the majority of the match, being penalized down to 13 men gave Qatar an opportunity to take the lead. At the final whistle the score was 25–19 to Qatar.

In March 2017, Lebanon competed in the Asian Rugby Championship, hosted by Uzbekistan in Tashkent. Lebanon defeated Iran 25 to 24 in the semi-final and drawing with hosts Uzbekistan 24 all in the final of the tournament to run out narrow ARC Div III West Champions.

On 24 April, Lebanon hosted the 2018 Asian Rugby Championship Division 3 West tournament in Jounieh, Lebanon. They defeated Jordan in the first round 62 – 3 and won against Iran 27 – 17 who had defeated Qatar in the semi-final to secure their fifth Asian title in six years.

Current squad

A full list of all capped Lebanese players: https://web.archive.org/web/20180428120026/http://www.lruf.org/player-profiles/

Record

Overall
Source

Hounors 
Middle-East Africa Championship – 2015

Mediterranean Cup – 1999, 2002, 2003, 2004, 2016, 2017

Middle-East and North-African Cup – 2012

See also
Rugby union in Lebanon

References

External links
 Lebanon on rugbydata.com
 https://web.archive.org/web/20180420143415/http://www.lruf.org/
 https://web.archive.org/web/20140909171325/http://www.globalrfu.com/2014/06/19/lebanese-phoenix-team-named-for-battle-in-lahore/

Asian national rugby union teams
Rugby union in Lebanon
National sports teams of Lebanon